, also referred to as , is a 2014 Japanese science fiction anime television series and the thirteenth incarnation of Sunrise's long-running Gundam mecha metaseries. Created for the Gundam 35th Anniversary celebration, it is the first Gundam TV series to be written and directed by Yoshiyuki Tomino since Turn A Gundam  in 1999 and features character designs by Kenichi Yoshida of Overman King Gainer & Eureka Seven fame.  Airing in the MBS/TBS networks' Animeism block starting in October 2014, it is the first traditional Gundam TV series to be initially released as a late night anime.

The first opening theme is "BLAZING" by Garnidelia, while the first ending theme is "G no Senkō" by Daisuke Hasegawa. The second opening theme is "Magic of Futari (ふたりのまほう)" by May J..

Episodes

References

Gundam Reconguista in G
Reconguista in G